A Man Like Me (Icelandic: Maður eins og ég) is a 2002 romantic comedy about the life of "Júlli" (Jón Gnarr), a lonely and confused man who is searching for some sense in his life. Surprisingly he meets a young woman from China (Stephanie Che) who changes his life dramatically. He falls in love with her but ruins the relationship because of his insecurity and his previous bad experiences. When he comes out of his disappointments and his depression that follow the breakup of the relationship, he decides to do everything in his power to change what has happened and get a second chance.

External links
 
 

2002 films
2002 comedy-drama films
2000s Icelandic-language films
Icelandic independent films
Films scored by Jóhann Jóhannsson
Films directed by Róbert Ingi Douglas
Icelandic comedy-drama films
2002 independent films